Electric Jesus is a 2020 American musical comedy drama film written and directed by Chris White and starring Brian Baumgartner.

Cast
Brian Baumgartner as Skip Wick
Judd Nelson as Pastor Wember
Shawn Parsons as Chris Angelopoulos
Rhoda Griffis as Donna
Claire Bronson as Rebekah
Andrew Eakle as Erik
Shannon Hutchinson as Sarah
Wyatt Lenhart as Michael
Caleb Hoffman as Scotty
Gunner Willis as Cliff
Will Oliver as Jamie
Jef Holbrook as Snarky Fan

Production
Filming occurred in Columbus, Georgia in 2019.

Release
The film was released on October 29, 2020 at the Orlando Film Festival.  The film was also shown at the Rome, Georgia International Film Festival on November 12, 2020.

In July 2021, it was announced that 1091 Pictures acquired North American distribution and non-fungible token rights to the film.

The film was screened at the National Infantry Museum on October 30, 2021.  It was released on November 2, 2021.

Reception
Brandy Lynn Sebren of MovieWeb gave the film a positive review and wrote, "If you can check 'yes, please' to Spinal Tap, Napoleon Dynamite, and Almost Famous, you've got yourself a wonderful treat to look forward to."

References

External links
 

1091 Pictures films
2020s English-language films